Carampoma District is one of thirty-two districts of the province Huarochirí in Peru.

Geography 
The La Viuda mountain range traverses the district. Some of the highest mountains of the district are listed below:

See also 
 Wachwaqucha
 Wamp'arqucha

References